

This is a list of the National Register of Historic Places listings in Hardeman County, Tennessee.

This is intended to be a complete list of the properties and districts on the National Register of Historic Places in Hardeman County, Tennessee, United States.  Latitude and longitude coordinates are provided for many National Register properties and districts; these locations may be seen together in a map.

There are 12 properties and districts listed on the National Register in the county, including 1 National Historic Landmark.  Another property was once listed but has been removed.

Current listings

|}

Former listing

|}

See also

 List of National Historic Landmarks in Tennessee
 National Register of Historic Places listings in Tennessee

References

Hardeman